Amasa Junius Parker (May 6, 1843, Delhi, Delaware County, New York – May 2, 1938, Albany, New York) was a member of the New York State Senate and a Major General of the National Guard of New York.

Life
Amasa Junius Parker Jr. was the son of Amasa J. Parker and his wife Harriet Langdon Parker. He graduated from Union College, Schenectady, New York in 1863 and the Albany Law School in 1864. He fought in the American Civil War and became a major.

He was a member of the New York State Assembly (Albany Co., 3rd D.) in 1882; and of the New York State Senate (17th D.) in 1886 and 1887; and again of the State Senate from 1892 to 1895, sitting in the 115th, 116th (both 17th D.), 117th and 118th New York State Legislatures (both 19th D.).

He was a trustee of Union College and the Albany Law School. He was active in the National Guard of New York and was a colonel in command of the Tenth Division during the breakup of the Albany Railroad Strike of 1877.

Parker was one of the authors of the book Banking Law of New York. He was also an editor of the Parker's New York Criminal and Penal Codes as well as The Parker's Pocket Code of Civil Procedure.

Parker was buried at the Albany Rural Cemetery in Menands, New York.

References

GEN. AMASA PARKER IS DEAD IN ALBANY in NYT on May 3, 1938 (subscription required)

Union College (New York) alumni
1843 births
1938 deaths
New York (state) state senators
Members of the New York State Assembly
People from Delhi, New York
Politicians from Albany, New York
Writers from Albany, New York
Burials at Albany Rural Cemetery
Albany Law School alumni
New York National Guard personnel
Union Army officers